Lecithodendriidae is a family of flatworms belonging to the order Plagiorchiida.

Genera

Genera:
 Acanthatrium Faust, 1919 
 Brandesia Stossich, 1899 
 Brenesia Caballero & Caballero, 1969

References

Platyhelminthes